The House of Teururai was the reigning family of the kingdom of Huahine and Maia'o between Ari'imate's coronation in 1852 and Teha'apapa III's cession of the kingdom to France in 1895.  Teururai kings first ruled Huahine in the middle of the 19th century. By the end 19th century, a member of the Teururai dynasty also held thrones in Raiatea.

Teururai monarchs ruled Huahine and Maia'o (from 1852) and Raiatea (from 1885) until the 1895 abdication of the each monarch during the French Third Republic annexation. The cadet line, the elected monarch of Raiatea, of the Teururai was deposed in 1888 whereas the senior line, for 7 years more, ruled until their Queen was deposed by French in 1895.

Ari'imate was the first Teururai ruler of Huahine and Maia'o, from 1852. The Teururai is closely related to the other Tahitian royal dynasty as the Royal family of Tahiti, then to the Royal family of Raiatea. From this Huahinean line comes the last royal line of Raiatea and Tahaa.

Origins 

The House of Teururai was originally a noble family from a chiefdom of Huahine.

The House of Teururai 

In 1840, Chief Ari'imate of Huahine, only grandson of the governor of Huahine, married Princess Maerehia of Raiatea, only daughter and thus heiress to the King Tamatoa of Raiatea and Tahaa.

The senior line of the Teururai remained, the ruling house of Huahine until 1895. This line was represented by Prince Marama, eldest son of King Ari'imate, through his eldest daughter, Queen Tehaapapa, the last sovereign of Huahine. He was regent to his Queen-daughter.

Teururai of Raiatea and Tahaa 
The Raiatea line of the House of Teururai was founded and represented by Tamatoa VI. Indeed, the younger brother of Prince Marama, Prince Ari'imate was designated King of Raiatea and Tahaa in 1884 and crowned in 1885. He was deposed by French in 1888. 
He became the last monarch of Raiatea and Tahaa. His descendant remains the royal family of Raiatea.

List of Teururai rulers

Monarchs of Huahine and Maia'o 
Dates indicate reigns, not lifetimes.

 King Ari'imate  (1852–1868)
 Queen Teha'apapa II (1868–1893)
 Queen Teha'apapa III (1893–1895)
 Queen Teuhe, in rebellion (1888–1890)
 Prince Marama (Regent) (1884–1895)

Monarchs of Raiatea and Tahaa 
Dates indicates reigns, not lifetime.

 King Tamatoa VI (1885-1888)

Legitimist claimants

Heads of the Huahine House of Teururai (since 1895) 

 Crown Prince Marama and his three daughters' descent:
 Her Majesty Queen Teha'apapa.
 Her Highness Princess Téa-nui-nui-ata.
 Her Highness Princess Té-tua-marama.
 King Tamatoa VI and his lineage:
 His Highness Crown Prince Tamatoa of Raiatea and Tahaa
 Prince Opuhara Pehupehu Teururai
 Princess Tevahineha'amo'eatua Teururai
 Princess Teri'imanaiterai Teururai
 Prince Mahine Taaroari'i Teururai
 Prince Tefauvero Teururai
 Princess Vai-ra'a-toa Teururai, she had issue three children's.
 Prince Téri'i-té-po-rou-ara'i Teururai (1857–1899), His family established in Tahiti.
 Prince Fatino Marae-ta'ata Teururai (1859–1884), He had issue eight children.
 Princess Tu-rai-ari'i Teururai (1862-?), she had issue two children through an irregular union.
 Princess Téri'i-na-va-ho-ro'a Teururai (1863–1918), she had eleven children.
 Princess Té-fa'a-ora Teururai (1868–1928), she had issue two daughters.

Claimants to the Raiatea crown

Heads of the House of Teururai 
 King Tamatoa VI and his lineage:
 His Highness Crown Prince Tamatoa of Raiatea and Tahaa
 Prince Opuhara Pehupehu Teururai
 Princess Tevahineha'amo'eatua Teururai
 Princess Teri'imanaiterai Teururai
 Prince Mahine Ta'aroari'i Teururai
 Prince Tefauvero Teururai

Others royal claimants 
 The Pomare royal family of Tahiti.
 The other descendants of the first's Tamatoa sovereign of Raiatea and Tahaa.

References 

Huahine royalty
Oceanian royal families